Jon Peters is a former high school pitcher from Brenham, Texas, famous for registering 53 straight wins. Standing 6'2" 190 lbs., he was well-known while in high school, and was the first high school baseball player to be featured on the cover of Sports Illustrated. He played at Brenham High School, later attending Texas A&M and  Blinn College.

References

External links
https://www.si.com/mlb/2019/06/28/jon-peters-superkid-1989
https://www.houstonchronicle.com/sports/texas-sports-nation/college/article/Once-Superkid-Jon-Peters-opens-up-on-struggles-12975735.php
https://www.baseballamerica.com/stories/where-are-they-now-jon-peters/

Year of birth missing (living people)
Living people
Baseball players from Texas
Blinn Buccaneers baseball players
People from Brenham, Texas
Texas A&M Aggies baseball players